Péter Sebestyén (born May 16, 1994) is a Hungarian motorcycle racer, competing in the 2022 Supersport World Championship for the Evan Bros. Yamaha team. He has raced in the Superbike World Championship, the FIM Superstock 1000 Cup, the 2010 and 2011 125cc World Championships, the Spanish 125GP Championship, the German 125GP Championship, the European Junior Cup and the Red Bull MotoGP Rookies Cup.

Career
Sebestyén entered the 2007 Red Bull MotoGP Rookies Cup aged only 13, and had to miss the first round of Spain in March, due to the minimum age requirement, as he would only turn 13 in May. He would race in rounds 2-8, scoring two point scoring finishes: a 13th place in Italy, and a 12th place in Germany. He finished the season 22nd in the standings, with seven points.

He stayed for the 2008 Red Bull MotoGP Rookies Cup as well, this time scoring points in six races, including a 6th place in Britain, and an 8th place in Germany. He finished the season 15th in the rider's championship, with 28 points.

In 2009, after his best results included the German GP in both seasons in the Red Bull Rookies Cup, he raced a full year in the German 125cc GP Championship, with moderate success.

In 2010, Sebestyén raced in the Spanish 125cc GP Championship, and performed well enough to earn himself three wild-card appearances in the 2010 125cc World Championship. He finished 23rd in Catalonia, retired in Aragon, and finished 17th in the season-closer at Valencia.

His wild-card results earned him a full ride for the 2011 125cc World Championship season, racing for Caretta Technology Forward Team. He struggled during the year, scoring no points, and a season's best finish of 18th in Valencia.

In 2012 and 2013, Sebestyén raced in the European Junior Cup by KTM. He scored no points in 2012, but finished in the points seven times out of eight races in 2013, including a second place in Magny-Cours. He ended the season 6th in the rider's championship, scoring 67 points.

Career statistics

Grand Prix motorcycle racing

By season

Races by year
(key) (Races in bold indicate pole position; races in italics indicate fastest lap)

Superbike World Championship

Races by year
(key) (Races in bold indicate pole position; races in italics indicate fastest lap)

Supersport World Championship

Races by year
(key) (Races in bold indicate pole position; races in italics indicate fastest lap)

References

External links
 

1994 births
Hungarian motorcycle racers
Living people
125cc World Championship riders
Superbike World Championship riders
FIM Superstock 1000 Cup riders
Supersport World Championship riders